Diego Perotti Almeira (born 26 July 1988) is an Argentine professional footballer. Mainly a winger who can play with both feet, he can also appear as an attacking midfielder.

He spent the better part of his career with Sevilla, appearing in 159 competitive games over six La Liga seasons (16 goals) and winning two major titles. In February 2016 he signed with Roma in the Italian Serie A, leaving four years later.

Perotti earned five caps for Argentina.

Club career

Sevilla

Born in Moreno, Buenos Aires of Italian ancestry on his father's side, Perotti joined Spain's Sevilla FC in the summer of 2007, from Club Deportivo Morón. At first he was assigned to the Andalusians' B-team which had just won promotion to the second division, and proved instrumental as the side retained their league status.

Perotti also started with the reserves in the 2008–09 season, receiving his first-team debut on 15 February 2009 as he appeared 15 minutes in a 2–0 win at RCD Espanyol. Often competing for a berth with another graduate, Diego Capel, his first goal for the club came against Deportivo de La Coruña on 23 May, as he scored in the 90th minute of the game to guarantee a third-place La Liga finish in the league, with the subsequent return to the UEFA Champions League.

During 2009–10, Perotti won the battle with Capel and became Sevilla's first-choice in his position, starting the campaign on a high note. On 16 March 2010, he netted against PFC CSKA Moscow for the Champions League round of 16, but the Russian team won 2–1 away and 3–2 on aggregate.

Perotti appeared in only 58 matches all competitions comprised from 2011 to 2014, mainly due to injuries. In February 2014, he was loaned to Boca Juniors in his homeland for six months.

Genoa
On 2 July 2014, Perotti signed for Italian club Genoa C.F.C. after agreeing to a four-year contract. He made his competitive debut on 31 August, playing 69 minutes in a 1–2 home loss to S.S.C. Napoli.

Roma
On 1 February 2016, Perotti joined fellow Serie A side A.S. Roma on loan for €1 million, with an option to buy for another €9 million. He scored his first goal six days later, the winner in a 2–1 home win over U.C. Sampdoria. Late into the month, he signed a permanent deal until June 2019.

Perotti scored ten competitive goals in his first full season for the runners-up, adding eight in his second. In 2018–19, however, he was often sidelined with injury problems.

Fenerbahçe
Perotti moved to Turkish club Fenerbahçe on 5 October 2020 on a two-year contract, with an option to extend for another year. On 1 September 2021, however, after having contracted a rare and serious knee injury, he left by mutual consent.

Salernitana
On 2 February 2022, Perotti returned to Italy and its top tier after signing a short-term contract with newly-promoted U.S. Salernitana 1919.

International career
On 9 November 2009, Perotti received his maiden call-up for the Argentina national team. He made his debut five days later, playing the last ten minutes of the 2–1 friendly loss against Spain in Madrid after having come on as a substitute for FC Barcelona's Lionel Messi.

Perotti was named in a preliminary 35-man squad for the 2018 FIFA World Cup in Russia but he did not make the final cut.

Personal life
Perotti's father, Hugo, was also a footballer.

Career statistics

Club

International

Honours
Sevilla
Copa del Rey: 2009–10
UEFA Europa League: 2013–14
Supercopa de España runner-up: 2010

References

External links

1988 births
Living people
People from Moreno Partido
Argentine people of Italian descent
Sportspeople from Buenos Aires Province
Argentine footballers
Association football wingers
Argentine Primera División players
Deportivo Morón footballers
Boca Juniors footballers
La Liga players
Segunda División players
Sevilla Atlético players
Sevilla FC players
Serie A players
Genoa C.F.C. players
A.S. Roma players
U.S. Salernitana 1919 players
Süper Lig players
Fenerbahçe S.K. footballers
Argentina international footballers
Argentine expatriate footballers
Expatriate footballers in Spain
Expatriate footballers in Italy
Expatriate footballers in Turkey
Argentine expatriate sportspeople in Spain
Argentine expatriate sportspeople in Italy
Argentine expatriate sportspeople in Turkey